Mount Reid is a prominent, mainly ice-free mountain, 3,315 m, standing just east of the head of Cleaves Glacier in the Holland Range. Discovered by the British Antarctic Expedition (1907–09) and named for Alfred Reid, manager of the expedition.
 

Mountains of the Ross Dependency
Shackleton Coast